Brisbane Women's Correctional Centre is an Australian prison, located at Wacol, Brisbane. It was commissioned on 28 May 1999.

Brisbane Women's Correctional Centre replaced the old Brisbane Women's Correctional Centre, located at Wacol. The centre has a capacity of 264 cells and is divided into two accommodation areas of 122 secure cells and 142 residential cells. The centre is the only reception, assessment and placement centre for female offenders in southern Queensland.

The centre accommodates female mainstream and protection prisoners and at times immigration detainees.

A purpose-built area accommodates up to eight women who are approved to have their children reside with them whilst in custody. In support of the accommodation of children within the facility and the role of women as primary carers, the centre facilitates a number of programs, activities, events and services related to women and children.

The centre has a structured daily program consisting of industry, education and vocational training programs that provide opportunities to address offending behaviour, and a comprehensive range of activities designed to enhance personal development and self esteem.

Notable prisoners

Cornelia Rau
Tracey Wigginton

See also

 List of Australian prisons

References
Kilroy, Debbie (2005). "Lost in a Black Hole." Courier Mail. 11 February.
Smith, Kristen (2001). "When Love Comes to Town." Courier Mail. 7 December.
Topsfield, Jewel (2005). "Rau's Odyssey." The Age. 6 July.

1999 establishments in Australia
Buildings and structures in Brisbane
Prisons in Queensland
Women's prisons in Australia
Wacol, Queensland